Manfred Vogt is a West German retired slalom canoeist who competed in the 1950s and the 1960s. He won five medals at the ICF Canoe Slalom World Championships with three golds (Folding K-1: 1957, Folding K-1 team: 1955, K-1 team: 1965) and two bronzes (Folding K-1 team: 1957, 1959).

References

German male canoeists
Possibly living people
Year of birth missing (living people)
Medalists at the ICF Canoe Slalom World Championships